Ranunculus is a genus of about 600 species of plants in the Ranunculaceae. Members of the genus include the buttercups, spearworts, water crowfoots and the  lesser celandine.

List of species

A

B

C

D

E

F

G

H

I

J

K

L

M

N

O

P

R

S

T

U

V

W

X

Y

Z

References

General
 The Plant List (Royal Botanic Gardens, Kew and Missouri Botanical Garden) - Species in Ranunculus
 USDA Natural Resources Conservation Service, PLANTS Database search with keyword = ranunculus
 USDA Germplam Resources Information Network (GRIN) Species Records of Ranunculus
 The Biota of North America Program (BONAP), North American Plant Atlas (NAPA), Ranunculus page
 TAMU Herbarium Vascular Plant Image Library - Species in Ranunculus
 eFloras.org - Flora of North America - Ranunculus subtaxa list

Specific

Ranunculus